Archibold Henry Hedges Cooper (14 August 1878 – 13 January 1922) was an English cricketer who played for Derbyshire in 1902.

Cooper was born in Cowley, Oxford, the son of Edward Cooper, a mercantile clerk and his wife Elizabeth. He played  in one match for Derbyshire against Yorkshire during the 1902 season, though he did not bat during the match. Cooper bowled two overs during the game and took one catch in the outfield.

Cooper died in Chesterfield at the age of 43.

References

1878 births
1922 deaths
English cricketers
Derbyshire cricketers